Çanakçı can refer to:

 Çanakçı
 Çanakçı, Çorum
 Çanakçı, Dursunbey
 Çanakçı, Karakoçan
 Çanakçı, Kemaliye
 Çanakçı rock tombs